Charles Hind (1827 – 1896) was Dean of Ferns from 1892 until 1896.

Hind was educated  at Trinity College, Dublin and ordained in 1851. After curacies in Rotherhithe, Stapenhill and Bolton he was Vicar of Silloth from 1872 until 1877 and then Rector of  Ferns until his appointment as Dean.

He died on 2 August 1896. His son was also an Anglican priest.

Notes

1827 births
Alumni of Trinity College Dublin
Deans of Ferns
1896 deaths